Jean Godin des Odonais (5 July 1713 Saint-Amand-Montrond, France - 1 March 1792 Paris) was a French cartographer and naturalist.

Biography
Godin des Odonais had joined the world's first geodesy expedition to the equator, led by Charles Marie de La Condamine. He had been recommended to La Condamine by the expedition's chief astronomer, his cousin Louis Godin. To be distinguished from his relative, Jean added to his surname that of his mother, Odonais.

When the commission returned to France, Godin des Odonais became professor of astronomy and natural science at the College of Quito, 1739. At the same time he studied the Indian languages and the flora of Ecuador.  His marriage with an heiress, Isabel Gramesón, gave him the means, and in 1743 he resigned his chair and gave his whole time to natural science and the Indian language.

He explored Ecuador and the northern provinces of Peru, and collected an herbarium containing more than 4,000 species of plants. He also made drawings of over 800 species of animals. Having lost the greater part of his wife's dowry in speculations, he resolved to try his fortune in Cayenne, where he arrived in May, 1750, and settled on the banks of the river Oyapok. For fifteen years he explored Cayenne and the Brazilian Guiana, north of the Amazon, and collected nearly 7,000 species of plants. From 1765 till 1773 he explored the Amazon.

In the latter year he finally returned to France, and settled on his estate of St. Amand. He gave his botanical collections to the museum of natural history, where they are still preserved. In 1784 he was elected a member of the French Academy of Science, and he labored thenceforth to arrange the notes taken during the many years of his explorations.

Works
 Flore raisonnée du Perou, comprenant 4,000 espèces, dont plus de 1,500 nouvelles (6 vols., Paris, 1776, with two volumes of illustrations containing over 750 plates)
 Les plantes de la Guyane (1777)
 Faune du Perou (4 vols., 1778, with two volumes of illustrations)
 Plan de navigation libre de l'Amazone, dedié au Duc de Choiseul (1779)
 Flore de la Guyane, explication de l'herbier déposé au museum d'histoire naturelle, with three volumes of illustrations (5 vols., 1779)
 Flore de l'Amazone, explication, etc. (4 vols., 1780, with one volume of illustrations)
 Grammaire de la langue Quichua ou des Incas (1782)
 Dictionnaire de la langue Quichua (1782)
 Vocabulaire des dialectes Indiens de la Guyane (1783)
 Grammaire comparée des langues Indiennes de l'Amérique du Sud (2 vols., 1784)

Notes

References
 Anthony Smith (2003) The Lost Lady of the Amazon: The Story of Isabela Godin and Her Epic Journey, Carroll & Graf
 Robert Whitaker (2004) The Mapmaker's Wife: A True Tale of Love, Murder, and Survival in the Amazon, Basic Books
 Celia Wakefield (1994) Searching for Isabel Godin, Chicago Review Press

External links
 Jean Godin biography 
 
 

History of Ecuador
1713 births
1792 deaths
18th-century French cartographers
French naturalists
Members of the French Academy of Sciences